WMAK is a radio station (1570 AM) licensed to Lobelville, Tennessee, United States. 

WMAK may also refer to:

WBEN (AM), a radio station (930 AM) licensed to Buffalo, New York, which held the call sign WMAK from 1922 to 1930
WUFO, a radio station (1080 AM) licensed to Amherst, New York, which held the call sign WMAK from 1930 to 1932
WNQM, a radio station (1300 AM) licensed to Nashville, Tennessee, which held the call sign WMAK from 1948 to 1982
WWKY (AM), a radio station (990 AM) licensed to Winchester, Kentucky, which held the call sign WMAK from 1986 to 1996
WCJK, a radio station (96.3 FM) licensed to Murfreesboro, Tennessee, which held the call sign WMAK from 2000 to 2005
WKNX-TV, a television station (channel 7) licensed to Knoxville, Tennessee, which held the call sign WMAK-TV from 2004 to 2013